Geertje Wielema (24 July 1934 – 18 August 2009) was a freestyle and backstroke swimmer from the Netherlands, who won the silver medal at the 1952 Summer Olympics in the 100 m backstroke. In 1954 she won three medals at European championships and was named Holland's first female Sportspersonality of the Year. She missed the 1956 Olympics in Melbourne due to their boycott by the Netherlands, but continued swimming until late 1950s and later served as a swimming judge. Between 1950 and 1954 she set five world records in medley relay and individual backstroke events.

References

1934 births
2009 deaths
Dutch female backstroke swimmers
Dutch female freestyle swimmers
World record setters in swimming
Olympic silver medalists for the Netherlands
Olympic swimmers of the Netherlands
Swimmers at the 1952 Summer Olympics
Medalists at the 1952 Summer Olympics
Sportspeople from Hilversum
European Aquatics Championships medalists in swimming
Olympic silver medalists in swimming
20th-century Dutch women